Motor Body Specialists was an Australian bus bodybuilder in Eagle Farm, Brisbane.

History
Motor Body Specialists commenced operations in 1964 bodying Bedford and Leyland. In January 1965, it signed a deal to distribute Commonwealth Engineering bodied buses in Queensland and northern New South Wales.

By the mid-1980s the operation had been renamed Rogers and it was concentrating on bodying Isuzu and later Hino chassis. By 1990 341 chassis has been bodied.

References

External links
Bus Australia gallery

Bus manufacturers of Australia
Eagle Farm, Queensland
Manufacturing companies based in Brisbane
1964 establishments in Australia